Ger toshav (ger: "foreigner" or "alien" + toshav: "resident", lit. "resident alien") is a halakhic term used in Judaism to designate the legal status of a Gentile (non-Jew) living in the Land of Israel who does not want to convert to Judaism but agrees to observe the Seven Laws of Noah, a set of imperatives which, according to the Talmud, were given by God as a binding set of universal moral laws for the "sons of Noah"—that is, all of humanity. A ger toshav, especially one who decides to follow the Noahic covenant out of religious belief rather than ethical reasoning, is commonly deemed a "Righteous Gentile" (Chassid Umot ha-Olam: "Pious People of the World"), and is assured of a place in the World to Come (Olam Ha-Ba).

Definition
A ger toshav ("resident alien") is a Gentile (non-Jew) living in the Land of Israel who agrees to follow the Seven Laws of Noah. The seven commandments of the Noahic Covenant to which the ger toshav agrees to be bound are enumerated in the Babylonian Talmud (Avodah Zarah 8:4, Sanhedrin 56a-b):
 Do not worship idols.
 Do not curse God.
 Do not murder.
 Do not commit adultery or sexual immorality.
 Do not steal.
 Do not eat flesh torn from a living animal.
 Establish courts of justice.

The Encyclopedia Talmudit, edited by rabbi Shlomo Yosef Zevin, states that after the giving of the Torah, the Jewish people were no longer included in the category of the sons of Noah; however, Maimonides (Mishneh Torah, Hilkhot M'lakhim 9:1) indicates that the seven commandments are also part of the Torah, and the Babylonian Talmud (Sanhedrin 59a, see also Tosafot ad. loc.) states that Jews are obligated in all things that Gentiles are obligated in, albeit with some differences in the details. According to the Encyclopedia Talmudit, most medieval Jewish authorities considered that all the seven commandments were given to Adam, although Maimonides (Mishneh Torah, Hilkhot M'lakhim 9:1) considered the dietary law to have been given to Noah.

The term ger toshav may be used in a formal or informal sense. In the formal sense, a ger toshav is a Gentile who officially accepts the seven Noahide laws as binding upon themself in the presence of three haberim (men of authority), or, according to the rabbinic tradition, before a beth din (Jewish rabbinical court). In the Talmud there are two other, differing opinions (Avodah Zarah, 64b) as to what the ger toshav accepts:
 To abstain from idolatrous practices of any kind (detailed in Exodus  and Deuteronomy ).
 To uphold all the 613 commandments in rabbinical enumeration, except for the prohibition against eating kosher animals that died by means other than ritual slaughter, or possibly (Meiri) any prohibition not involving kareth.

The accepted opinion is that the ger toshav must accept the seven Noahide laws before a rabbinical court of three. They will receive certain legal protection and privileges from the community, the rules regarding Jewish-Gentile relations are modified, and there is an obligation to render him aid when in need. The restrictions on having a Gentile do work for a Jew on the Shabbat are also greater when the Gentile is a ger toshav.

In the informal sense, a ger toshav is a Gentile who agrees to follow the seven Noahide laws on his own, or alternatively, simply rejects idolatry (the latter issue is in particular brought up regarding Muslims). According to the rabbinic tradition, a Gentile who agrees to follow the seven Noahide laws, although not before a beth din, is still regarded as Chassid Umot ha-Olam ("Pious People of the World"), and the observance of the Seven Laws of Noah grants them a place in the World to Come (Olam Ha-Ba). There is a debate among the halakhic authorities as to whether the rules regarding a ger toshav would apply to the informal case.

The procedure to officially recognize the legal status of ger toshav has been discontinued since the cessation of the year of Jubilee with the destruction of the Second Temple of Jerusalem; hence, there are no formal gerim toshavim extant today. However, it can be argued that a great deal are "informal" ones, especially since it is possible to be a Chassid Umot ha-Olam even when the Jubilee year is not observed.

Modern times and views 

Menachem Mendel Schneerson, the Lubavitcher Rebbe, encouraged his followers on many occasions to preach the Seven Laws of Noah, devoting some of his addresses to the subtleties of this code. Since the 1990s, Orthodox Jewish rabbis from Israel, most notably those affiliated to Chabad-Lubavitch and religious Zionist organizations, including The Temple Institute, have set up a modern Noahide movement. These Noahide organizations, led by religious Zionist and Orthodox Jewish rabbis, are aimed at non-Jews in order to proselytize among them and commit them to follow the Noahide laws. According to Rachel Z. Feldman, American anthropologist and Assistant Professor of Religious Studies at Dartmouth College, many of the Orthodox Jewish rabbis involved in mentoring Noahides are supporters of the Third Temple movement who believe that the messianic era shall begin with the establishment of a Jewish theocratic state in Israel, supported by communities of Noahides worldwide:

Feldman describes Noahidism as a "new world religion" that "carv[es] out a place for non-Jews in the messianic Zionist project" and "affirms the superiority of Judaism and Jewish biblical right to the Land of Israel, in line with the aims of the growing messianic Third Temple Movement in Jerusalem." She characterizes Noahide ideology in the Philippines and elsewhere in the global south as having a "markedly racial dimension" constructed around "an essential categorical difference between Jews and Noahides". David Novak, professor of Jewish theology and ethics at the University of Toronto, has denounced the modern Noahide movement by stating that "If Jews are telling Gentiles what to do, it’s a form of imperialism".

According to the Jewish philosopher and professor Menachem Kellner's study on Maimonidean texts (1991), a ger toshav could be a transitional stage on the way to becoming a "righteous alien" (ger tzedek), i.e. a full convert to Judaism. He conjectures that, according to Maimonides, only a full ger tzedek would be found during the Messianic era. Furthermore, Kellner criticizes the assumption within Orthodox Judaism that there is an "ontological divide between Jews and Gentiles", which he believes is contrary to what Maimonides thought and the Torah teaches, stating that "Gentiles as well as Jews are fully created in the image of God".

According to Menachem Mendel Schneerson, the status of ger toshav will continue to exist, even in the Messianic era. This is based on the statement in Hilkhot M'lakhim 12:5 that lit. “all the world (kol ha'olam) will be nothing but to know G‑d." In its plain meaning, he asserts, kol ha'olam also includes Gentiles. As proof, he cites 11:4, which deals with the Messianic era, and the similar term ha'olam kulo, "the world in its entirety", refers to Gentiles. Continuing the text in Hilkhot M'lakhim 12:5, Maimonides explicitly changes the topic to Jews by using the term Yisra'el, explaining that "Therefore, the Jews will be great sages and know the hidden matters, grasping the knowledge of their Creator according to the full extent of human potential", indicating that Jews and Gentiles will co-exist in the time of the Messiah. In any case, even when there is a Jewish king and a Sanhedrin, and all the twelve tribes live in the Land of Israel, Jewish law does not permit forcing someone to convert and become a ger tzedek against his will.

High Council of 

A "High Council of ", set up to represent Noahide communities around the world, was endorsed by a group that claimed to be the new Sanhedrin. The High Council of  consists of a group of Noahides who, at the request of the nascent Sanhedrin, gathered in Jerusalem on 10 January 2006 to be recognized as an international Noahide organization for the purpose of serving as a bridge between the nascent Sanhedrin and Noahides worldwide. There were ten initial members who flew to Israel and pledged to uphold the Seven Laws of Noah and to conduct themselves under the authority of the Noahide  (religious court) of the nascent Sanhedrin.

See also
 Am ha-aretz
 Conversion to Judaism
 Ethical monotheism
 God-fearer
 Noahidism
 Proselyte
 Righteous Among the Nations
 Seven Laws of Noah
 Virtuous pagan, similar concept in Christianity

References

Bibliography

Biblical law
Codes of conduct
Jewish belief and doctrine
Jewish courts and civil law
Jewish ethical law
Jewish law and rituals
Judaism and society
Land of Israel laws in Judaism
Noahides
Talmud concepts and terminology
Virtue ethics